The canton of Les Corbières is an administrative division of the Aude department, southern France. It was created at the French canton reorganisation which came into effect in March 2015. Its seat is in Fabrezan.

It consists of the following communes:
 
Albas
Albières
Auriac
Bouisse
Boutenac
Camplong-d'Aude
Cascastel-des-Corbières
Coustouge
Cucugnan
Davejean
Dernacueillette
Duilhac-sous-Peyrepertuse
Durban-Corbières
Embres-et-Castelmaure
Fabrezan
Félines-Termenès
Ferrals-les-Corbières
Fontcouverte
Fontjoncouse
Fraissé-des-Corbières
Jonquières
Lagrasse
Lairière
Lanet
Laroque-de-Fa
Luc-sur-Orbieu
Maisons
Massac
Montgaillard
Montjoi
Montséret
Mouthoumet
Padern
Palairac
Paziols
Quintillan
Ribaute
Rouffiac-des-Corbières
Saint-André-de-Roquelongue
Saint-Jean-de-Barrou
Saint-Laurent-de-la-Cabrerisse
Saint-Martin-des-Puits
Saint-Pierre-des-Champs
Salza
Soulatgé
Talairan
Termes
Thézan-des-Corbières
Tournissan
Tuchan
Vignevieille
Villeneuve-les-Corbières
Villerouge-Termenès
Villesèque-des-Corbières

References

Cantons of Aude